Ofir Katz (born 19 May 1980) is an Israeli politician. He is currently a member of the Knesset for Likud and the parliamentary whip of the coalition.

Biography
Born in Afula, Katz joined Likud during at the age of 18, and started working for the office of Benjamin Netanyahu when Likud were the opposition party in the late 2000s. When Likud became the ruling party after the 2009 elections, he became an advisor to Minister of Culture and Sport Limor Livnat, before starting to work for Gilad Erdan when he was 	Minister of Internal Affairs and Minister of Public Security.

In the build-up to the April 2019 elections, he was placed twentieth on the party's list, the slot reserved for the Galilee and Valleys. He was elected to the Knesset as Likud won 36 seats.

Katz is married with two children and lives in Afula.

References

External links

1980 births
Living people
Israeli Jews
Jewish Israeli politicians
Likud politicians
Members of the 21st Knesset (2019)
Members of the 22nd Knesset (2019–2020)
Members of the 23rd Knesset (2020–2021)
Members of the 24th Knesset (2021–2022)
Members of the 25th Knesset (2022–)
People from Afula